Christopher D. Price (born May 3, 1976 in San Diego, California) is an American conservative Baptist pastor, theologian, and writer. He is currently serving as Lead Pastor of Northside Baptist Church in Garland, Texas.

Education
Price's academic qualifications include prerequisite studies at Angelina College  and Jacksonville College. He also earned a Bachelor's degree in Religion from Baptist Missionary Association Theological Seminary in 2006 and a Master's Religion from Baptist Missionary Association Theological Seminary in 2007.

Religious credentials
Price was licensed for ministry at Calvary Baptist Church, Crockett, Texas in September 1998 and later ordained to the Pastoral Ministry by Carlos Missionary Baptist Church, Carlos, Texas on June 26, 2005. He has successfully ministered to congregations in the Southern Baptists of Texas Convention (SBTC) and the Baptist Missionary Association of America (B.M.A.A.) While at the BMATS he was recognized for this scholastic achievements placed on the Dean's List.

Family
Chris wed Denise Foster Price on June 26, 1998 in Crockett, Texas with Lynn Stephens officiating. This union was blessed with their only daughter, Remington, born September 2, 1999.

Ministry
 August 2008 – present: Northside Baptist Church, Garland, Texas - Lead Pastor
 July 2006 – August 2008: Pine Grove Baptist Church, Diboll, TX  - Pastor
 March 2005 – June 2006: Carlos Missionary Baptist Church, Carlos, TX  - Pastor
 August 2004 – March 2005: Pulpit Supply
 2003–2004: Central Baptist Church, Crockett, TX  - Youth Team Leader
 2001–2002: West Side Baptist Church, Crockett, TX  - Youth Pastor
 1999–2000: North Side Baptist Church, Mineola, Texas  - Pastor of Youth & Outreach

References

Baptist ministers from the United States
American Baptist theologians
Baptist Missionary Association Theological Seminary alumni
American sermon writers
Baptist writers
1976 births
Living people
Angelina College alumni